The Farmers Charity Classic was a golf tournament on the Champions Tour from 1986 to 2004. It was played in Grand Rapids, Michigan area, first at the Elks Country Club (1986–1989), then at The Highlands (1990–1993), and finally at the Egypt Valley Country Club (1994–2004) in nearby Ada.

The purse for the 2004 tournament was US$1,600,000, with $240,000 going to the winner. The tournament was founded in 1986 as the Greater Grand Rapids Open.

Winners
2004 Jim Thorpe
2003 Doug Tewell
2002 Jay Sigel
2001 Larry Nelson

Foremost Insurance Championship
2000 Larry Nelson
1999 Christy O'Connor Jnr

First of America Classic
1998 George Archer
1997 Gil Morgan
1996 Dave Stockton
1995 Jimmy Powell
1994 Tony Jacklin
1993 George Archer
1992 Gibby Gilbert
1991 Harold Henning

Greater Grand Rapids Open
1990 Don Massengale
1989 John Paul Cain
1988 Orville Moody
1987 Billy Casper
1986 Jim Ferree

Source:

References

Former PGA Tour Champions events
Golf in Michigan
Recurring sporting events established in 1986
Recurring sporting events disestablished in 2004
1986 establishments in Michigan
2004 disestablishments in Michigan